The International Tribunal for the Law of the Sea (ITLOS) is an intergovernmental organization created by the mandate of the Third United Nations Conference on the Law of the Sea. It was established by the United Nations Convention on the Law of the Sea, signed at Montego Bay, Jamaica, on December 10, 1982. The Convention entered into force on November 16, 1994, and established an international framework for law over all ocean space, its uses and resources. The ITLOS is one of four dispute resolution mechanisms listed in Article 287 of the UNCLOS.

The Tribunal is based in Hamburg, Germany. The Convention also established the International Seabed Authority, with responsibility for the regulation of seabed mining beyond the limits of national jurisdiction, that is beyond the limits of the territorial sea, the contiguous zone and the continental shelf.  There are currently 168 signatories, 167 states plus the European Union. , holdouts included the United States and the Islamic Republic of Iran.

Composition
According to its founding statute, the Tribunal has a set of 21 judges who serve from a variety of states parties, "according to a method that intends to assure an equitable geographical representation".

At the request of Chile and the European Union, the Tribunal set up a special chamber composed of five judges to deal with the Case concerning the Conservation and Sustainable Exploitation of Swordfish Stocks in the South-Eastern Pacific Ocean (Chile/European Community).

By agreement of the parties Ghana and Ivory Coast, the Tribunal formed a special chamber composed of five judges to deal with the Dispute concerning Delimitation of the Maritime Boundary between Ghana and Côte d'Ivoire in the Atlantic Ocean (Ghana/Côte d'Ivoire).

By agreement of the parties Mauritius and Maldives, the Tribunal formed a special chamber of seven permanent judges and two ad hoc judges to deal with the Dispute concerning Delimitation of the Maritime Boundary between Mauritius and Maldives in the Indian Ocean (Mauritius/Maldives).

Seats
Disputes referred to the International Tribunal for the Law of the Sea or one of its chambers can be heard in Germany or in Singapore.

Current judges

Former judges

Cases

References

External links

 
 International Foundation for the Law of the Sea
 Privileges and Immunities, Berlin, 14 December 2004

Law of the sea
Intergovernmental organizations established by treaty
International courts and tribunals
United Nations General Assembly observers
Organizations established in 1982
Organisations based in Hamburg
1982 establishments in Jamaica